Claire Van Vliet (born 1933 in Ottawa, Ontario) is an artist, illustrator, and typographer who founded Janus Press in San Diego, California in 1955.

Biography 
Van Vliet received the Bachelor of Arts in 1952 from San Diego State College, and the Master of Fine Arts from Claremont Graduate School in 1954.  In 1955 she moved to Europe, shortly after her first publications, then returned to the United States in 1957.  She worked for John Anderson of Lanston Monotype Company in Philadelphia before moving to Madison, Wisconsin.  She made several trips back to Europe and continued her education in hand typesetting and compositing. She taught drawing and printmaking classes at the Philadelphia Museum School of Art and Philadelphia Museum College of Art from 1965 to 1966. In 1967 she established a typographic workshop in Madison, Wisconsin. The Janus Press has been based in Newark, Vermont since Van Vliet settled there in 1966.

The Janus Press was named by Van Vliet for the Roman god Janus. The press publishes collaborative works by contemporary writers, papermakers, printmakers and artists, including  Raymond Carver, Tess Gallagher, Seamus Heaney, Ted Hughes, W. R. Johnson, Galway Kinnell, John le Carré, Denise Levertov, Sandra McPherson, W. D. Snodgrass, Ruth Fine, Lois K. Johnson, Susan Johanknecht, Jerome Kaplan, Ray Metzker, Peter Schumann, Helen Siegl, Kathryn Clark (Twinrocker), Amanda Degener, Mary Lyn Nutting, Katie MacGregor, and Bernie Vinzani.

Honors
1989 – John D. and Catherine T. MacArthur Foundation Prize Fellowship
1993 – Honorary Doctor of Fine Arts, University of Arts in Philadelphia
1995 – Elected to the National Academy of Design in New York
2002 – Honorary Doctor of Fine Arts, San Diego State University
2017 – Frederic W. Goudy Award, Cary Graphic Arts Collection at the Rochester Institute of Technology

Publications
 Claire Van Vliet. (1978?) Printmaker and Printer : a selection of prints and illustrated books from the Press at the  Rutgers University Art Gallery in New Brunswick, New  Jersey, from November 5 to December 17, 1978.  [New Brunswick, N.J.] : Rutgers University Art Gallery,
 Van Vliet, Claire. (2002).  Woven and interlocking book structures : from the Janus,  Steiner, and Gefn presses / Newark, Vt. : Janus Gefn Unlimited.

References

Further reading
The Janus Press .  (1982) 1955–1980 : Silver Anniversary Miscellany: [finally all gathered together in 1982]. [West Burke, Vt.] : Janus Press
Bright, Betty. (2005).  "The Fine Press Book: The Janus Press: a new demeanor for fine printing."  No longer innocent : book art in America : 1960–1980 / New York City : Granary Books : Distributed to the trade by Distributed Art Publishers.

External links
The Janus Press in the Rare Book and Special Collections Division at the Library of Congress
 King Lear Archive in the Rare Book and Special Collections Division at the Library of Congress
 Artists' Books Collection in the University of Wisconsin Digital Collections

1933 births
Living people
Canadian illustrators
Canadian printers
Artists from Ottawa
Canadian typographers and type designers
MacArthur Fellows
San Diego State University alumni
Claremont Graduate University alumni
20th-century Canadian women artists
Women graphic designers